Osman Ghani Khan (1923-2000) was the former chairman of the United Nations Board of Auditors, a Bangladeshi civil servant, economist, Bangladesh Nationalist Party politician and the former Member of Parliament of Pabna-2.

Education
Khan passed higher secondary from Government Saadat College in 1940. In 1943 and 1945, he received his B.A. (Honours) and M.A. in Economics from University of Calcutta, respectively.

Career
Khan was appointed the first Defense secretary of Bangladesh in 1972. He was appointed to the constitutional post Comptroller and Auditor General of Bangladesh at 1976. From 1980 to 1982, Khan was elected as chairman of the United Nations Board of Auditors. After retirement, he was elected as a member of parliament from Pabna-2 as a Bangladesh Nationalist Party candidate in 1991. He was appointed the Minister of Public Administration.

Death
Khan died on 26 April 2000 in Mount Elizabeth Hospital, Singapore.

References

Bangladeshi civil servants
Bangladesh Nationalist Party politicians
Public Administration ministers of Bangladesh
2000 deaths
5th Jatiya Sangsad members
People from Pabna District
University of Calcutta alumni
1923 births